Erich Rudorffer (1 November 1917 – 8 April 2016) was a German Luftwaffe fighter ace who was one of a handful who served with the Luftwaffe through the whole of World War II. He was one of the most successful fighter pilots in the history of air warfare, with 222 victories claimed. Rudorffer fought in all the major German theaters of war, including the European and Mediterranean Theater of Operations and the Eastern Front. During the war he flew more than 1000 combat missions, engaging in aerial combat over 300 times. Rudorffer was shot down by flak and enemy fighters 16 times and had to take to his parachute nine times.

Early life

Rudorffer was born on 1 November 1917 in Zwochau, at the time in the Kingdom of Saxony of the German Empire. After graduation from school, he received a vocational education as an automobile metalsmith specialized in coachbuilding. He joined the military service of the Luftwaffe with Flieger-Ersatz-Abteilung 61 (Flier Replacement Unit 61) in Oschatz on 16 April 1936. From 2 September to 15 October 1936, he served with Kampfgeschwader 253 (KG 253—253rd Bomber Wing) and from 16 October 1936 to 24 February 1937 was trained as an aircraft engine mechanic at the Technische Schule Adlershof, the technical school at Adlershof in Berlin. On 14 March 1937, Rudorffer was posted to Kampfgeschwader 153 (KG 153—153rd Bomber Wing), where he served as a mechanic until end October 1938. He was then transferred to Flieger-Ersatz-Abteilung 51 (Flier Replacement Unit 51) based at Liegnitz in Silesia, present-day Legnica in Poland, for flight training. There he was first trained as a bomber pilot and then as a Zerstörer,  a heavy fighter or destroyer, pilot. According to Berger, Rudorffer then worked as an airline pilot for the Deutsche Luft Hansa.

On 1 October 1939, Rudorffer was transferred to the Jagdwaffe (fighter force) and was posted to the Jagdfliegerschule 2 (fighter pilot school) at Schleißheim. Following this conversion training, he was transferred to the Jagdergänzungsstaffel Döberitz, the supplementary fighter squadron based at Döberitz, on 6 December 1939. On 28 December 1939, he was transferred to the Ergänzungs-Jagdgruppe Merseburg, another supplementary training unit stationed at Merseburg, where newly trained fighter pilots received instruction from pilots with combat experience. He stayed there until 7 January 1940, one day later, Rudorffer, now an Oberfeldwebel (staff sergeant), was posted to the 2. Staffel (2nd squadron) of Jagdgeschwader 2 "Richthofen" (JG 2—2nd Fighter Wing), named after the World War I fighter ace Manfred von Richthofen.

World War II
Rudorffer claimed his first kill, a Curtiss Hawk 75, on 14 May 1940. He scored eight more times before the capitulation of France. He flew throughout the Battle of Britain, and it is claimed he was pursued down Croydon High Street below rooftop level by a Hurricane. He achieved his nineteenth victory on 1 May 1941; he was then awarded the Knight's Cross of the Iron Cross. On 19 May 1941, Rudorffer and his wingman attacked a diving submarine off the Isle of Portland. It was observed that both bombs struck close and that the submarine went down vertically.

On 18 June 1941, II. Gruppe moved from Beaumont-le-Roger to Abbeville-Drucat where it stayed for the next six months. From this point on, the Gruppe defended against the RAF Fighter Command "non-stop offensive" over France. In July 1941, while flying with the Stab (headquarters unit) of JG 2, Rudorffer claimed six aerial victories. This figure includes two Spitfires on 7 July, a Spitfire and a Hurricane on 9 July, one Spitfire on 10 and 11 July each. He then served with 6. Staffel of JG 2 and claimed fifteen further aerial victories by the end of 1941, taking his total to 41. Rudorffer was appointed Staffelkapitän (squadron leader) of 6. Staffel of JG 2 on 1 November 1941, thus succeeding Oberleutnant Frank Liesendahl who was transferred. In March 1942, II. Gruppe began converting to the Focke-Wulf Fw 190 A-2. Conversion training was done in a round-robin system, Staffel by Staffel, at the Le Bourget Airfield near Paris. The conversion completed by end-April. From then on, the Gruppe was equipped with the Fw 190 A-2 and A-3 variant. In 1942, Rudorffer participated in Operation Cerberus (Channel Dash) and flew over the Allied landings at Dieppe in August 1942.

Mediterranean Theater
In early November 1942, the Western Allies launched Operation Torch, the Anglo–American invasion of French North Africa. On 17 November, II. Gruppe of JG 2 was withdrawn from the English Channel Front and ordered to San Pietro Clarenza, Sicily. At the time, the Gruppe was equipped with the Fw 190 A-3, some Fw 190 A-2s, and received the A-4 variant in early December. This made II. Gruppe of JG 2 the only Fw 190 equipped fighter unit in the Mediterranean Theater. The Gruppe flew its first missions on 19 November, securing German air and sea transportation to Tunis. That day, elements of II. Gruppe began relocating to Bizerte Airfield. On 9 February 1943 Rudorffer claimed to have defeated 8 British pilots during a 32-minute aerial battle, and for the first time became an "ace-in-a-day". Again on 15 February he claimed 7 kills. Among his claims during the North Africa were 10 Allied bombers.

On 17 April 1943, Rudorffer was appointed Gruppenkommandeur (group commander) of II. Gruppe of JG 2. He replaced Hauptmann Adolf Dickfeld in this capacity who had been transferred to II. Gruppe of Jagdgeschwader 11 (JG 11—11th Fighter Wing). A little over two months later, on 30 June, he was transferred again, taking command of IV. Gruppe of Jagdgeschwader 54 (JG 54—54th Fighter Wing) on the Eastern Front. Command of II. Gruppe of JG 2 was handed over to Hauptmann Kurt Bühligen. When on 30 July Hauptmann Heinrich Jung, the commander of II. Gruppe of JG 54 was killed in action, Rudorffer was again transferred, taking command of II. Gruppe on 1 August. Command of IV. Gruppe was temporarily assigned to Hauptmann Alfred Teumer before it officially was handed to Hauptmann Rudolf Sinner on 14 September.

He claimed his first victory in that theater on 7 August. Due to the experience gained in combat with the RAF he achieved considerable success. During his first sortie on 24 August 1943, 5 Soviet aircraft were downed in 4 minutes.

On 11 October 1943, Rudorffer was also credited with his 100th aerial victory. He was the 55th Luftwaffe pilot to achieve the century mark. In aerial combat near Teremky and Glychow, he claimed a Yak-7, his 100th victory, at 12:22, a LaGG-3 at 12:22, and three more Yak-7 shot down at 12:24, 12:25 and 12:27 respectively. On 6 November 1943, Rudorffer was credited with 13 aerial victories, eight Yak-7s and five Yak-9s in the timeframe 13:00 to 13:17, taking his total to 122 aerial victories.

Flying the Messerschmitt Me 262
JG 7 "Nowotny" was the first operational jet fighter wing in the world and was named after Walter Nowotny, who was killed in action on 8 November 1944. Nowotny, a fighter pilot credited with 258 aerial victories and recipient of the Knight's Cross of the Iron Cross with Oak Leaves, Swords and Diamonds, had been assessing the Messerschmitt Me 262 jet aircraft under operational conditions. JG 7 "Nowotny" was equipped with the Me 262, an aircraft which was heavily armed and faster than any Allied fighter. General der Jagdflieger (General of the Fighter Force) Adolf Galland hoped that the Me 262 would compensate for the Allies' numerical superiority. On 12 November 1944, the Oberkommando der Luftwaffe (OKL—Air Force High Command) ordered JG 7 "Nowotny" to be equipped with the Me 262. Galland appointed Oberst Johannes Steinhoff as its first Geschwaderkommodore (wing commander).

In the winter of 1944 Rudorffer was trained on the Me 262 jet fighter. In February 1945, he was recalled to command I. Gruppe JG 7 "Nowotny" from Major Theodor Weissenberger who replaced Steinhoff as Geschwaderkommodore. Rudorffer claimed 12 victories with the Me 262, to bring his total to 222. His tally included 136 on the Eastern Front, 26 in North Africa and 60 on the Western Front including 10 heavy bombers.

After the war

Rudorffer started out flying DC-2s and DC-3s in Australia. Later on he worked for Pan Am and the Luftfahrt-Bundesamt, Germany's civil aviation authority. Rudorffer was one of the characters in the 2007 Finnish war movie Tali-Ihantala 1944. A Fw 190 participated, painted in the same markings as Rudorffer's aircraft in 1944. The aircraft, now based at Omaka Aerodrome in New Zealand, still wears the colours of Rudorffer's machine. He died in April 2016 at the age of 98.
At the time of his death, he was the last living recipient of the Knight's Cross of the Iron Cross with Oak Leaves and Swords.

Summary of career

Aerial victory claims
According to US historian David T. Zabecki, Rudorffer was credited with 224 aerial victories. Mathews and Foreman, authors of Luftwaffe Aces — Biographies and Victory Claims, researched the German Federal Archives and found records for 219 aerial victory claims, plus two further unconfirmed claims. This figure of confirmed claims includes 134 aerial victories on the Eastern Front and 85 on the Western Front, including 11 four-engined bombers and 12 victories with the Me 262 jet fighter.

Victory claims were logged to a map-reference (PQ = Planquadrat), for example "PQ 35 Ost 53224". These sectors were then subdivided into 36 smaller units to give a location area 3 × 4 km in size.

Awards
 Wound Badge in Black
 Honour Goblet of the Luftwaffe (Ehrenpokal der Luftwaffe) (20 October 1940)
 Front Flying Clasp of the Luftwaffe in Gold with Pennant "1000"
 Combined Pilots-Observation Badge
 Finnish Order of the Cross of Liberty (2nd class)
 German Cross in Gold on 9 December 1941 as Leutnant in the 2./JG 2
 Iron Cross (1939)
 2nd Class (22 May 1940)
 1st Class (28 June 1940)
 Knight's Cross of the Iron Cross with Oak Leaves and Swords
 Knight's Cross  on 1 May 1941 as Leutnant and pilot in the 6./Jagdgeschwader 2 "Richthofen"
 447th Oak Leaves on 11 April 1944 as Major and Gruppenkommandeur of the II./Jagdgeschwader 54
 126th Swords  on 26 January 1945 as Major (war officer) and Gruppenkommandeur of the II./Jagdgeschwader 54

Dates of rank

Notes

References

Citations

Bibliography

 
 
 
 
 
 
 
 
 
 
 
 
 
 
 
 
 
 
 
 
 
 

1917 births
2016 deaths
Luftwaffe pilots
People from the Kingdom of Saxony
German World War II flying aces
Recipients of the Gold German Cross
Recipients of the Knight's Cross of the Iron Cross with Oak Leaves and Swords
Recipients of the Order of the Cross of Liberty, 2nd Class
Military personnel from Saxony
People from Nordsachsen